Nihal  is an Asian given name that may refer to the following notable people:

Nihal Arthanayake, English radio and TV presenter known as DJ Nihal
Nihal Atsız, Turkish writer
Nihal Bhareti, Sri Lankan radio personality
Nihal Güres, Turkish artist
Nihal Nelson, Sri Lankan baila singer
Nihal Singh, Indian royalty 
Nihal Singh Takshak, Indian freedom fighter
Nihal Sarin, Indian chess player
Nihal Yeğinobalı, Turkish writer
Şükûfe Nihal Başar (1896–1973), Turkish school teacher, poet, novelist and women's right activist

Indian masculine given names
Turkish feminine given names